"Selah" is a song by American rapper Kanye West from his ninth studio album, Jesus Is King (2019). The song contains additional vocals from Ant Clemons, BongoByTheWay, and the Sunday Service Choir. West co-wrote it with 11 others, while Jeffrey LaValley received songwriting credit due to the song sampling a rendition of the New Jerusalem Choir's work. A hip hop and gospel song, it instrumentally relies on military drums. The song includes samples of the Sunday Service Choir's rendition of "Revelations 19:1". Lyrically, it sees West asserting his Christian faith and referencing Bible verses. The song had originally been slated for release on Yandhi in November 2018 until the album was scrapped, though it later leaked the following year.

Ultimately released as the second track on Jesus Is King in October 2019, "Selah" received lukewarm reviews from music critics. They were often complementary towards the composition and a few praised the sampling of the Sunday Service Choir, though some critics expressed negative feelings of the song's lyrical content. It was among the Winning Gospel Songs at the 2021 ASCAP Rhythm & Soul Awards. The song charted at number 19 on the US Billboard Hot 100 and also reached the top 20 in Australia, Canada, Latvia, and the United Kingdom. It has been certified gold in the United States by the Recording Industry Association of America (RIAA). West and the Sunday Service Choir performed the song live in November 2019. It was used for the Super Bowl LIV and Super Bowl LV trailers of the tenth Fast & Furious franchise film, F9 (2021). The album's accompanying film of the same name features an alternative version of the song.

A rendition of the New Jerusalem Choir's "Revelations 19:1" was released on the Sunday Service Choir's debut studio album, Jesus Is Born (2019). Despite being sampled within "Selah", the former was released two months later. A gospel song, the rendition includes a chorus that features praise for Jesus Christ being delivered by the Sunday Service Choir. It charted at number 17 on the US Billboard Gospel Songs chart in 2020. The rendition has been performed live by the Sunday Service Choir on multiple occasions.

Background and development 

American singer-songwriter Ant Clemons first became involved with West during the recording sessions for the rapper's eight studio album Ye (2018), with Clemons helping record the album's second single "All Mine" (2018). Following on from Clemons being involved with West as a songwriter for Teyana Taylor's second studio album K.T.S.E. in June 2018, the two of them didn't see each other again until the fall of that year. At that time, Clemons went to Chicago and found himself freestyling in front of others, including West. During the freestyle session, Clemons gave West a demo he worked on, off of which they built the skeleton of "Selah", originally called "Chakras". Alongside helping create the song and providing backing vocals for it, Clemons contributed vocals to fellow Jesus Is King tracks "Everything We Need" and "Water".

In 2019, West and vocal arranger Nikki Grier of gospel group the Sunday Service Choir re-wrote the lyrics of songs by him. While doing this, West took on the stance of wanting to create music related to God, setting out to make Christian music. Though some members of the Sunday Service Choir had been initially dismissive of ideas by West, the group ultimately warmed up to his ideas. Throughout 2019, the Sunday Service Choir's concerts were popular with numerous celebrities, including American actor Brad Pitt. The group ultimately worked on Jesus Is King, being heavily involved with it vocally. The first feature on the album is from the Sunday Service Choir on the track "Every Hour", while the group provided additional vocals for "Selah" as well as "Everything We Need" and "Water". Alongside the Sunday Service Choir and Clemons, the former of the three includes vocals from record producer Bongo ByTheWay.

West had originally planned to release "Selah" on Yandhi in November 2018 and recorded a demo for it, though the album was ultimately shelved. In August 2019, West's wife Kim Kardashian posted an image of a track list for Jesus Is King that showed the song slated for release on it. In the image, the Bible was open to Psalm 57:6, a passage that uses the word "Selah". By September 29, 2019, West had re-recorded certain lyrics for the song. It later leaked online on October 13 of that year after being played at 2019 listening sessions for the album in Detroit, Chicago and New York, with the leak being different from the version of the song played at the listening sessions. In response to the song and other tracks by GOOD Music rappers leaking in October 2019, the record label's president Pusha T branded the leaks "cute" but he stated that "if I find out who is leaking it, I will make a decent example out of you...and no one can stop it, no Kanye, nobody!" Def Jam Recordings shared a trailer for Jesus Is King that same month, featuring a preview of the song. Jeffrey LaValley, musical director of the New Jerusalem Choir, received writing credit on "Selah" due to having created and wrote the melody of the group's recording "Revelations 19:1" (1984), which the song samples a rendition of. With the original version having been released back in 1984, West only needed a mechanical license for usage because it could be classified as public domain. He also wrote the song, along with Cyhi the Prynce, Consequence, Federico Vindver, No Malice, BoogzDaBeast, Rennard East, Pusha T, E*vax, Sean Leon, John Boyd, and Adam Wright. The title "Selah" is a Hebrew term that appears throughout the Book of Psalms, which West defined as a term meaning "to look back and reflect upon".

Composition and lyrics

Musically, "Selah" is a hip hop and gospel track. Instrumentation for the song consists primarily of military drums, which have been noted for conveying attitude. The chord progression of it was compared to that of the track "Gerudo Valley", from the soundtrack of video game The Legend of Zelda: Ocarina of Time (1998). The song features samples of a gospel rendition of the New Jerusalem Choir's "Revelations 19:1", as performed by the Sunday Service Choir. Prior to the song's chorus, organ chords are featured alongside West rapping. The chorus includes repeated "hallelujah" chants from the Sunday Service Choir, which are sampled from the rendition. Percussion and sound effects of metal scraping accompany the chorus, while the octave of the vocals rises. The group being sampled adds gospel vocals to the chorus and as it continues, the instrumentation is silenced. A capella singing from the Sunday Service Choir follows, while the chorus ends with the line "He is wonderful" from the group. After the chorus, West raps in time with the drums coming in.

The lyrics of the song are used by West to assert his faith in Christianity, with it including verses of the Bible being referenced by him. The song opens with West using his faith to boast, "God is king, we the soldiers," which alludes to West's past and how he has evolved over time. Comparing himself to Noah before the story of the Genesis flood took place, West mentions that he is being judged. West delivers Christian rapping, including him using the lyrics: "Everybody wanted Yandhi/Then Jesus Christ did the laundry." The lyrics indicate that West scrapped Yandhi due to his religious beliefs after going through a new birth experience, since he vowed to no longer create secular music, providing fans with meaning of the album being shelved. West uses certain lyrics to reference John 8:33 and John 8:36. For the conclusion of the song, crys of "Woo" are heard.

Release and promotion
"Selah" was released on October 25, 2019, as the second track on West's ninth studio album Jesus Is King. On September 28, 2019, West played the song twice during a listening party for the album at the Auditorium Theatre in Chicago. Of the song's presence at the listening session, attendee Donald Lawrence recalled that watching "a crowd that was probably 25% African American, 75% caucasian — hip-hop kids from the suburbs — go bananas when the choir came in [was amazing]". The following day, West previewed the song as part of the album's listening party at New York's United Palace.

West and the Sunday Service Choir performed the song live at Bethany Church in Baton Rouge on November 3, 2019. For West's Sunday Service Experience at Joel Osteen's Lakewood Church on November 17 of that year, the song was performed by him and the group. During the performance, the line "He saved a wretch like me" was sung off-key by West. West performed the song live during a Sunday Service concert at Pigeon Forge's LeConte Center on January 19, 2020. On January 27, West held a midnight Sunday Service concert in tribute to American basketball player Kobe Bryant after the 2020 Calabasas helicopter crash killed 9 people including Bryant and his daughter. West performed the song live during the concert, with his sister-in-law Kourtney Kardashian sharing videos of him performing it to her Instagram Stories.

Reception

"Selah" was met with lukewarm reviews from music critics, with general praise for the composition. Rawiya Kameir of Pitchfork noted "the battle drums that propel" the song for echoing "the stark, confrontational attitude of" West's sixth studio album Yeezus (2013). Entertainment Weeklys Brian Josephs praised the song for the Sunday Service Choir going "to awe in the climax". Jordan Bassett from NME commented that the song features "dour organ" and "intermittent percussion". Sam C. Mac of Slant Magazine viewed the Sunday Service Choir as "on hand" for elevating the song, specifically with a "hallelujah" chant "that's augmented by dynamic leaps in octave and by Ye's colossal bursts of percussive, scraping-metal sound effects". Will Rosebury from Clash admitted that hearing West rap the lyrics, "Keeping perfect composure/When I scream at the chauffeur/I ain't mean I'm just focused" would mean the fans "fearing an ultra-positive Kanye will breathe a sigh of relief," while Rosebury questioned "who the fuck wants a reined-in Kanye West?" In a review for American Songwriter, Luke Levenson stated the song is where "West punctuates his bars with bible verses several times," which he called "punchy moments" that are "weighed down by the effeteness" of certain lyrics. Levenson elaborated, describing West as delivering the lyrics "with an exerted vocal effect, tensing up his throat as the track drives beneath his voice" and concluded by writing that this "amounts to heavy stuff," though is "less gripping" than West's previous works related to God. The New York Times critic Jon Caramanica opined that the song "swells until West cites Bible verses over door-slam percussion, suggesting an explosion of religious awakening", while noting his rapping sometimes being "tart".

In a mixed review, Brendan Klinkenberg of Rolling Stone complemented the song's composition for "lightly affected organs opening to bludgeoning percussion and a crescendoing choir" but criticized West's rapping due to being what "capsizes the vessel" and slammed his lyricism. For The Atlantic, Spencer Kornhaber said that the album's excitement "comes to a thud" when West begins rapping on the song, criticizing his lyricism despite directing praise towards the song's drums and the addition of the Sunday Service Choir for the chorus. Wren Graves was more negative at Consequence, noting the drums "temporarily impress" and analyzing that the song "creates an expectant atmosphere with moody organs" alongside the Sunday Service Choir "whispering 'Hallelujah'" as West "quotes the Book of John on bondage and slavery," but complained that even though you think it "is going somewhere" due to the Sunday Service Choir getting louder and the tension rising, "poof, nothing happens". Graves expressed further criticism, describing the later part of the song as where West "returns with a meandering verse about greed, betrayal, forgiveness, and truth, saying nothing as he tries to cover everything," concluding that there is "no central idea, no point". Ross Horton from The Line of Best Fit listed the song among the parts of Jesus Is King "not worth saving," branding it as "a bunch of Bible verses interspersed with barbed, growled snatches of vocal". In The Guardian, Dean Van Nguyen called the song's lyrical content "as thin as Bible paper". 

"Selah" received a nomination for Top Gospel Song at the 2020 Billboard Music Awards, though ultimately lost the award to fellow album track "Follow God". At the 2021 ASCAP Rhythm & Soul Awards, the former was awarded as one of the Winning Gospel Songs.

Commercial performance
Following the release of Jesus Is King, "Selah" debuted on the US Billboard Hot 100 at number 19. The track remained on the Hot 100 for two weeks. It entered at number three on the US Christian Songs chart, alongside charting identically on the Gospel Songs chart. On the US Hot R&B/Hip-Hop Songs chart, the track reached number 10. "Selah" was certified gold by the Recording Industry Association of America (RIAA) for amassing 500,000 certified units in the United States on July 9, 2021.

The track entered the Canadian Hot 100 at number 19, charting identically to its debut on the Billboard Hot 100. Similarly, "Selah" reached number 18 on the ARIA Singles Chart, standing as the album's second highest charting track in Australia. The track was less successful on the New Zealand Singles Chart, debuting at number 24. It charted identically on the Latvian Singles Chart and UK Singles Chart, peaking at number 19 on both of the charts. Top 30 positions were attained by the track in Iceland, Ireland, Denmark, and Estonia. In Slovakia, the track experienced lesser performance, peaking at number 31 on the country's Singles Digitál Top 100 chart. It also reached the top 50 in Switzerland, Lithuania and Portugal.

Appearances in media
West screened his concert film Jesus Is King at The Forum in the County of Los Angeles on October 23, 2019, revealing "Selah" as part of the soundtrack. Two days later, Jesus Is King was released simultaneously with the album of the same name, including a special mix of the song that is listed in the film's credits. American musician Louie Zong shared an edit of "Selah" that combined it with "Gerudo Valley" on the same day, which was met with generally positive responses from fans of West. On November 14, 2019, LaValley recalled his niece calling him from Phoenix and "saying congratulations," with LaValley questioning in response: "Congratulations? Congratulations for what?" LaValley's niece replied by telling that his "tune is on Kanye's album," with him responding with: "Girl, shut up," and laughing, while being amazed when seeing himself credit as a writer on the song. According to LaValley, the song's popularity brought more attention to the New Jerusalem Choir version, which he labeled "an honor". When questioned about West possibly performing the song in LaValley's hometown of Flint, he stated: "I don't know. I'd love for him to. I'd love to see him come to Flint," though LaValley acknowledged that an appearance from West "would be controversial".

Kim Kardashian shared a video of her and Kanye's daughter Chicago West singing the "hallelujah" part of "Selah" via Instagram on January 28, 2020. Kardashian captioned the video "Chi's favorite songs 🙏🏼✨" and fans praised Chicago's singing skills, while Kanye later stated that it is their daughter's favorite song. On February 2, 2020, the Super Bowl LIV trailer for the tenth Fast & Furious franchise film F9 (2021) was released and included the song. The song was later used in another trailer that premiered at the Super Bowl LV in February 2021.

Sunday Service Choir version

A rendition of the track "Revelations 19:1" by the New Jerusalem Baptist Church Choir was recorded by the Sunday Service Choir, and the rendition is sampled within "Selah". The Sunday Service Choir version of "Revelations 19:1" was released on December 25, 2019, as the third track on the group's debut studio album Jesus Is Born. However, this was two months after the release of "Selah" on Jesus Is King, meaning that the rendition had been sampled prior to release. In January 2019, former West Angeles Church of God in Christ music director Jason White received a call from Ray Romulus of the Stereotypes telling him that Kanye West wanted a choir, requesting 100 people for it and to put together a band. Despite being "a little scared" of getting involved with any of West's controversies, White said that he "could see something different about this guy" on the night of first meeting West in rehearsal and he has since served as the Sunday Service Choir's director. White solely arranged the rendition, while he also composed it alongside Nikki Grier, Stephen A. Hurd and Steve Epting.

"Revelations 19:1" is a gospel track, which features the Sunday Service Choir singing for over five minutes. Its chorus sees the group deliver praise for Christ, including them singing "hallelujah" repeatedly. The rendition reached number 17 on the US Billboard Gospel Songs chart for the issue date of January 11, 2020. It has been regularly performed live by the Sunday Service Choir on a weekly basis.

Credits and personnel
Credits adapted from Tidal.
 Jason White arranger, composer
 Nikki Grier composer
 Stephen A. Hurd composer
 Steve Epting composer

A. Jeffrey LaValley--composer of Revelation 19:1

Credits and personnel
Credits for "Selah" adapted from Tidal and the BMI Repertoire.

 Kanye West production, songwriter
 E*vax production, songwriter
 BoogzDaBeast co-production, songwriter
 Frederico Vindver co-production, songwriter
 Benny Blanco additional production
 Francis Starlite additional production
 Cyhi the Prynce songwriter
 Consequence songwriter
 No Malice songwriter
 Jeffrey LaValley songwriter
 Rennard East songwriter
 Pusha T songwriter
 Sean Leon songwriter
 John Boyd songwriter
 Adam Wright songwriter
 Anthony Clemons additional vocals
 BongoByTheWay additional vocals
 Sunday Service Choir additional vocals
 Mike Dean mastering engineer, mixer
 Jess Jackson mixer
 Andrew Drucker recording engineer
 Jamie Peters recording engineer
 Jesse Ray Emster recording engineer
 Josh Bales recording engineer
 Josh Berg recording engineer
 Randy Urbanski recording engineer
 Shane Fitzgibbon recording engineer
 Steven Felix recording engineer
 Zack Djurich recording engineer

Charts

Weekly charts

Year-end charts

Certifications

Notes

References

External links
 Fast and Furious 9 Trailer Song – Selah song lyrics at camlyrics

2019 songs
Christian hip hop songs
Gospel songs
Kanye West songs
Song recordings produced by Benny Blanco
Song recordings produced by Kanye West
Songs written by Consequence (rapper)
Songs written by Cyhi the Prynce
Songs written by Pusha T